Inclov is the world's first match-making application for disabled people.

History 

Inclov was established in 2016 by Kalyani Khona, and Shankar Srinivasan later joined as a co-founder. It is based in Gurugram, India. The application is available in Hindi, English, and Punjabi languages. Khona initially started the business offline as a marriage bureau in Mumbai named Wanted Umbrella in 2014, and after receiving favourable feedback from the differently-abled community and a round of crowd-funding, went online with the Inclov name, and Srinivasan as co-founder, in 2016. 

In 2017, Inclov raised pre-Series A funding.

Idea 
The idea behind Inclov is to create an inclusive place for people with disabilities to find their marriage partner, and counter social inhibitions regarding disabilities in India.Social Spaces is an initiative spread across India by Inclov to organize accessible meet-ups of differently-abled people.

References

External links 
Official Website 

Matchmaking software companies